German submarine U-962 was a Type VIIC U-boat built for Nazi Germany's Kriegsmarine during World War II. Her keel was laid at the yards of Blohm & Voss in Hamburg on 7 April 1942. Launched on 17 December 1942, she was formally commissioned  on 11 February 1943 and given to Oberleutnant zur See Ernst Liesberg, who commanded the submarine on both of her active war patrols.

Design
German Type VIIC submarines were preceded by the shorter Type VIIB submarines. U-962 had a displacement of  when at the surface and  while submerged. She had two shafts and two  propellers.

U-962 was fitted with five  torpedo tubes (four fitted at the bow and one at the stern), fourteen torpedoes, one  SK C/35 naval gun, 220 rounds, and one twin  C/30 anti-aircraft gun. The boat had a complement of between forty-four and sixty.

Service history

War patrols
After her working up period ended, U-962 departed Kiel for Bergen, Norway on 23 September 1943, arriving on 27 September. After a stay of about a month, the crew cast off on their first active patrol 3 November 1943. This 56-day cruise in the mid-Atlantic Ocean yielded no targets and the patrol was terminated at St. Nazaire in occupied France on 28 December 1943.

On 14 February 1944, U-962 departed St. Nazaire on her second and last patrol. There were no survivors.

Wolfpacks
U-962 took part in five wolfpacks, namely:
 Coronel (4 – 8 December 1943) 
 Coronel 2 (8 – 14 December 1943) 
 Coronel 3 (14 – 17 December 1943) 
 Borkum (18 – 26 December 1943) 
 Preussen (22 February – 22 March 1944)

References

Bibliography

External links

World War II submarines of Germany
German Type VIIC submarines
World War II shipwrecks in the Atlantic Ocean
U-boats sunk by British warships
U-boats commissioned in 1943
U-boats sunk in 1944
1942 ships
Ships built in Hamburg
U-boats sunk by depth charges
Ships lost with all hands
Maritime incidents in April 1944